Naqada () is a town on the west bank of the Nile in Qena Governorate, Egypt, situated ca. 20 km north of Luxor. It includes the villages of Tukh, Khatara, Danfiq, and Zawayda. According to 1960 census, it is one of the most uninhabited areas and had only 3,000 inhabitants, mostly of Christian faith who preserved elements of the Coptic language up until the 1930s.

Archaeology
Naqada stands near the site of a prehistoric Egyptian necropolis: The town, called Ombos, was the centre of the cult of Set and large tombs were built there  3500 BCE.

The large quantity of remains from Naqada have enabled the dating of the entire archeological period throughout Egypt and environs, hence the town name Naqada is used for the pre-dynastic Naqada culture  4400–3000 BCE. Other Naqada culture archeological sites include el Badari, the Gerzeh culture, and Nekhen.

In Popular Culture 

In the Stargate franchise, alien civilizations make extensive use of a mineral, naquada, named after the archaeological site.

Gallery

See also

List of cities and towns in Egypt
Amratian culture
Ifri N'Ammar
Kelif el Boroud
Kulubnarti
Luxmanda

References

Predynastic Egypt
Archaeological sites in Egypt
Populated places in Qena Governorate
5th-millennium BC establishments
Set (deity)
ar:نقادة